The Ghana Standards Authority (GSA) formerly Ghana Standards Board (GSB) is a Government of Ghana agency responsible for the maintenance of acceptable standards for product and services and sound management practices in industries and public institutions in Ghana.

History
The Ghana Standards Authority the a Board was set up in 1973 by NRC Decree, 173.
The body was established by the Standards Decree, 1967 (NLCD 199) which has been superseded by the Standards Decree, 1973 (NRCD 173). The Authority is also the custodian of the Weights and Measures Decree (NRCD 326, 1975).

Functions
The board's functions are:
to establish and promote standards for the manufacturing of high quality goods and services in Ghana.
to improve the levels of standard in industry and commerce.
to promote productivity and efficiency in work places
to promote standards in public health, safety and welfare for consumers of various goods and services.

Divisions
The following divisions are under the Ghana Standards Authority:
 
 Metrology 
 Standards
 Testing
 Certification
 Inspectorate
 Administration & Organizational Dev.
 Finance & Corporate Planning.

The Authority uses four strategies in performing its functions namely: Metrology, Standards, Testing and Quality Assurance (MSTQ). The Ghana Standards Board's function in industry include the development of standards, certification of systems used in industries. It also certifies products and runs test training for industries to promote compliance of industries to the set standards of the board. The board reviews industry conformity to regulations and calibrates weighing and measuring instruments such as fuel pumps. The board performs physical analysis of products before they can be sold.

Regional offices
The board operates a decentralized system for effective monitoring and supervision, allowing it to operate at a regional level. There are seven regional board offices:

Ho, responsible for Volta Region
Koforidua, responsible for the Eastern Region
Takoradi, responsible for Western Region 
Kumasi, responsible for Ashanti 
Sunyani, responsible for Brong Ahafo Region
Cape Coast, responsible for Central Region
Tamale, in charge of the three Northern Regions namely Upper East, Upper West and Northern Regions.

Inspection entry point
The board promotes product safety by monitoring all goods that are imported to and exported from the country. There are six entry official entry points into Ghana, each of which is staffed by GSB personnel: 
Tema Harbour
Takoradi Harbour
Kotoka International Airport
Aflao entry point
Elubo entry point
Paga entry point

Affiliations
The Ghana Standards Authority takes part in: It is affiliated to the following institutions:
 International Standards Organisation (ISO) 	
 International Organisation for Legal Meteorology (OIML) 
 African Organisation for Standardization (ARSO)  
 CODEX Alimentarius Commission (CODEX) 
 Africa Electro-Technical Commission (AFSEC)
 International Bureau of Weights and Measures (BIPM) 
 International Electrotechnical Commission (IEC)
 ASTM International

See also
International Standards Organisation
International Bureau of Weights and Measures
ASTM International

External links
 African Organisation for Standardization
 International Organisation for Legal Meteorology
 CODEX Alimentarius Commission
 Africa Electro-Technical Commission
 International Electrotechnical Commission

References

Ministries and Agencies of State of Ghana